Edward Henry Wordley (17 October 1923 – 1989) was an English footballer who played in the Football League for Stoke City.

Career
Wordley Joined Stoke from local side Summerbank in time for the first season after World War II. He made his debut in a 5–0 win against Preston North End in February 1947 and went on to play four more times during the 1946–47 season as Stoke narrowly missed out on the First Division title. However Wordley failed to make an impression on manager Bob McGrory and made just five more league appearances in the next three seasons. Following his release in 1950 he joined Bury but failed to break in to the side and decided to pursue a different career.

Career statistics

References

English footballers
Stoke City F.C. players
Bury F.C. players
English Football League players
1923 births
1989 deaths
Macclesfield Town F.C. players
Association football midfielders